Clivina planifrons is a species of ground beetle in the subfamily Scaritinae. It was described by Sloane in 1907.

References

planifrons
Beetles described in 1907